Moodnopsis inornatella is a species of snout moth in the genus Moodnopsis. It is found in Brazil.

References

Moths described in 1888
Phycitinae